Clematis texensis, commonly called scarlet leather flower, is a climbing vine in the buttercup family (Ranunculaceae). It is native to the United States, where it is endemic to the Edwards Plateau of Texas. Its natural habitat is on rocky limestone cliffs and streamsides.

Description
This is an herbaceous and slightly woody vine that can climb to nine feet. It produces bell-shaped flowers bloom on new growth in the spring and summer.  The flower petals are thick and leather-like with scarlet-colored sepals.  After the flower blooms a feathery ball of plumed seeds will be displayed.
This Clematis is a very hardy and drought tolerant and when planted in sunny conditions flowers may persist until the first frost.

Cultivation
Crosses with other clematis varieties have yielded varieties showier than the species, such as "Duchess of Albany", "Princess Diana", "Gravetye Beauty", "Sir Trevor Lawrence", and "Etoile Rose", in colors from pink to dark scarlet red. Clematis texensis and its crosses tend to have four petals; blossoms resemble lily-flowered tulips, and sometimes display as downward-facing bells.

Uses
Chop dried stems can be brewed into a tea that treats headaches and migraines.  Historically, a tincture could be made to function as a counter-irritant that, when applied to the skin's surface, produces an irritation that counteracts an underlying discomfort.

References

External links
The species Clematis texensis - pictures and information
Clematis 'Dutchess of Albany'

texensis
Flora of Texas